This is a list of Belgian television related events from 2012.

Events
17 March - Glenn Claes wins the first season of The Voice van Vlaanderen.
2 November - 11-year-old singer Karolien Goris wins the first season of Belgium's Got Talent.

Debuts
31 August - Belgium's Got Talent (2012-present)

Television shows

1990s
Samson en Gert (1990-present)
Familie (1991-present)
Thuis (1995-present)

2000s
Mega Mindy (2006-present)
Sterren op de Dansvloer (2006-2013)

2010s
ROX (2011-present)
The Voice van Vlaanderen (2011-present)

Ending this year

Births

Deaths

See also
2012 in Belgium